The following lists events that happened during 1922 in South Africa.

Incumbents
 Monarch: King George V.
 Governor-General and High Commissioner for Southern Africa: Prince Arthur of Connaught.
 Prime Minister: Jan Smuts.
 Chief Justice: James Rose Innes.

Events

March
 10-14 – The Rand Rebellion, a strike by white mine workers which began on 28 December 1921, becomes open rebellion against the state.
 15 – Samuel Long, labour pioneer and striker, is arrested.

April
 1 – The South African Railways take control of all railway operations in South West Africa.

October
 27 – Southern Rhodesians vote in a referendum and reject union with South Africa.

November
 17 – Rand Rebellion strikers Samuel Long, Herbert Hull and David Lewis are hanged for murder.

December
 6 – The prophet Nontetha is arrested by authorities fearful of a repeat of the Bulhoek Massacre

Births

 6 May – Elize Botha, first wife of State President P. W. Botha. (d. 1997)
 22 May – Looksmart Khulile Ngudle, politician, (d. 1963)
 22 October – Thomas Nkobi, politician, (d. 1994)
 5 November – Sydney Kentridge, lawyer, judge and member of the English Bar.
 8 November – Chris Barnard, cardiac surgeon and heart transplant pioneer. (d. 2001)

Deaths

Railways

South West African lines
 1 April – The SAR inherits five existing former German Colonial railway lines in SWA.
 Union Border to Swakop River (at Swakopmund), .
 Seeheim to Lüderitz, .
 Karibib to Tsumeb (Narrow gauge), .
 Otavi to Grootfontein (Narrow gauge), .
 Otjiwarongo to Outjo (Narrow gauge), .

Railway lines opened
 1 April – SWA – Kolmanskop to Bogenfels, .

Locomotives

 1 April – The SAR inherits seven former German Colonial narrow gauge and Cape gauge steam locomotive types in SWA.
 One narrow gauge Class Ha 0-6-2 tank locomotive, acquired in 1904 for the Otavi Mining and Railway Company.
 Six narrow gauge Class Hb 0-6-2 tank and tank-and-tender locomotives, acquired between 1905 and 1908 for the Otavi Mining and Railway Company.
 Three narrow gauge Class Hd 2-8-2 locomotives, acquired in 1912 for the Otavi Mining and Railway Company for use on the line from Swakopmund to Karibib.
 Two narrow gauge 0-6-2 Jung tank locomotives, introduced on the Otavi Mining and Railway Company in 1904.
 One pair of narrow gauge 0-6-0 Zwillinge twin tank locomotives, introduced by the Swakopmund-Windhuk Staatsbahn in 1898.
 Five Cape gauge Eight-Coupled Tank locomotives, introduced by the Lüderitzbucht Eisenbahn in 1907.
 Nine Cape gauge Eight-Coupled Tender locomotives, introduced by the Staatsbahn Lüderitzbucht-Keetmanshoop in 1911.
 The SAR places six new Class NG5 2-8-2 Mikado steam locomotives in service on the narrow gauge Otavi branch in SWA.

References

South Africa
Years in South Africa
History of South Africa
1920s in South Africa
Years of the 20th century in South Africa